The Fiesta of Our Lady of Guadalupe in the village of Tortugas, New Mexico, in Doña Ana County, New Mexico, is an annual three day festival in December. It includes processions, church services, traditional dances, and a  pilgrimage up Tortugas Mountain. The festival is held December 10, 11, 12.

It honors the Virgin and relates to Nuestra Señora de Guadalupe.

The festival originated at the Mission Nuestra Señora de Guadalupe in what is now Chihuahua in Mexico and was moved later to Tortugas, New Mexico.

The Tortugas Pueblo Fiesta of Our Lady of Guadalupe is the name of a 2017 listing on the U.S. National Register of Historic Places. It presumably includes the shrine and parish of Our Lady of Guadalupe.

The announced bounds of the listing ("bounded by Emilia Rd., E. Guadalupe St., Juan Diego Ave., and Stern Dr.") enclose a five block area, which does include the Our Lady of Guadalupe school. 

There was no festival in 2020.

References

External links
Tortugas Pueblo - Fiesta of Our Lady of Guadalupe, YouTube video by Jett Loe, Las Cruces Sun-News
Our People, Our Faith... Our Lady / Fiesta of Our Lady of Guadalupe - Tortugas, N.M., YouTube video

Festivals in New Mexico
Historic districts on the National Register of Historic Places in New Mexico
National Register of Historic Places in Doña Ana County, New Mexico